Steven Bernard Howard (born 1963) is a former American Major League Baseball outfielder. He played for the Oakland Athletics during the  season. Howard played for Laney College and Castlemont High School.

References

External links

Major League Baseball outfielders
Oakland Athletics players
1963 births
Living people
African-American baseball players
Huntsville Stars players
Idaho Falls A's players
Madison Muskies players
Medford A's players
Modesto A's players
Richmond Braves players
Rieleros de Aguascalientes players
American expatriate baseball players in Mexico
Tacoma Tigers players
Junior college baseball players in the United States
Baseball players from Oakland, California
Laney Eagles football players